Galtara is a genus of tiger moths in the family Erebidae. The genus was erected by Francis Walker in 1863.

Species
Galtara aurivilii (Pagenstecher, 1901)
Galtara colettae Toulgoët, 1976
Galtara convergens Toulgoët, 1979
Galtara doriae (Oberthür, 1880)
Galtara elongata (Swinhoe, 1907)
Galtara extensa (Butler, 1880)
Galtara laportei Toulgoët, 1979
Galtara nepheloptera (Hampson, 1910)
Galtara notabilis Toulgoët, 1980
Galtara pulverata (Hampson, 1900)
Galtara purata Walker, 1863
Galtara reticulata (Hampson, 1909)
Galtara somaliensis (Hampson, 1916)
Galtara turlini Toulgoët, 1979

References

Nyctemerina
Moth genera